Jelača is a village in the municipality of Priboj, Serbia. According to the 2002 census, the village had a population of 254.

References

Populated places in Zlatibor District